Patch Adams is a 1998 American biographical comedy-drama film directed by Tom Shadyac and starring Robin Williams in the lead role, Monica Potter, Philip Seymour Hoffman, Bob Gunton, Daniel London, and Peter Coyote. Set in the late 1960s/early 1970s, it is loosely based on the life story of Dr. Hunter "Patch" Adams and the book Gesundheit: Good Health Is a Laughing Matter by Dr. Adams and Maureen Mylander. It received generally unfavorable reviews from critics, with criticism for the sentimentality and direction. Despite the terrible reviews, the film was a box office success grossing $202.3 million against a $50–90 million budget.

Plot
In 1969, Hunter "Patch" Adams, after developing suicidal thoughts, admits himself to a mental institution. Once there, he finds that using humor, rather than doctor-centered psychotherapy, better helps his fellow patients and provides him with a new purpose in life. Because of this, he wants to become a medical doctor, and swiftly leaves the facility. Two years later, he enrolls at the Medical College of Virginia (now known as VCU School of Medicine) as the oldest first-year student. He questions the school's soulless approach to medical care, particularly why students do not work with patients until their third year, as well as the methods of the school's Dean Walcott, who takes an instant disliking to Patch and believes that doctors must treat patients his way and not befriend them. Because of this and incidents such as setting up a giant model papier-mâché pair of legs in stirrups during an obstetric conference, he is expelled from the medical school, although he is later reinstated when it becomes apparent to the school that his unorthodox methods often improve his patients' physical and mental health. Adams encourages medical students to work closely with nurses, learn interviewing skills early, and argues that death should be treated with dignity and sometimes even humor.

Patch begins a friendship with fellow student Carin Fisher and, during their third year as medical students, develops his idea for a medical clinic built around his philosophy of treating patients using humor and compassion. With the help of Arthur Mendelson, a wealthy man who was a patient whom Patch met while in the mental hospital, he purchases  in West Virginia to construct the future Gesundheit! Institute. Together with Carin, medical student Truman Schiff, and some old friends, he renovates an old cottage into a clinic. When they get the clinic running, they treat patients without medical insurance and perform comedy sketches for them.

Patch's close friendship with Carin soon turns into romance. When Carin reveals to him that she had been molested as a child, Patch comforts her and reassures her that she can overcome her pain by helping others. Encouraged, Carin wants to help a disturbed patient, Lawrence "Larry" Silver. However, Larry murders Carin with a shotgun, then immediately commits suicide. Patch, guilt-ridden by Carin's death, begins to question the goodness in humanity. Standing on a cliff, he contemplates suicide again and asks God for an explanation. He then sees a butterfly that reminds him that Carin had always wished she was a caterpillar that could turn into a butterfly and fly away. The butterfly lands on his medical bag and shirt before flying away. With his spirits revived, Patch decides to dedicate his work to her memory.

Walcott eventually discovers that Patch has been illegally running a clinic and practicing medicine without a license and attempts to expel him again because of this, as well as complaints that he has made his patients uncomfortable (which is obviously not true). Desperate to prove Walcott wrong, Patch files a grievance with the state medical board on the advice of his former medical school roommate, conservative Mitch Roman. Patch succeeds in convincing the board that he must treat the spirit as well as the body. The board, although they still find some of his methods very unorthodox, allows him to graduate and he receives a standing ovation from the packed hearing room.

At graduation, Patch receives his Doctor of Medicine and, bowing to the professors and audience, reveals himself to be naked underneath his cap and gown.

Cast

Production

Development
Paul Attanasio was brought in as a script doctor to work on the film prior to shooting.

The film was shot in three locations: Treasure Island, California (near San Francisco), Asheville (North Carolina), and the University of North Carolina at Chapel Hill. A diner was temporarily placed in Point Richmond (a neighborhood in Richmond, California) and served as the University Diner. Several interior classroom scenes were filmed on the campus of UC Berkeley.

The film has several major departures from Adams' real history. One is that the character of Carin is fictional but is analogous to a real-life friend of Adams (a man) who was murdered under similar circumstances. Another difference is the then-47-year-old Robin Williams portrays Adams as enrolling in medical school very late in his life, his older age even being brought up in dialogue. In reality, Adams started medical school immediately and his educational progress was quite normal for a physician: he graduated high school at 18, college at 22, and medical school at 26.

Reception

Box office
The film was released on December 25, 1998, in the United States and Canada and grossed $25.2 million in 2,712 theaters its opening weekend, ranking #1 at the box office. Upon opening, it achieved the third-highest December opening weekend, behind Titanic and Scream 2. It went on to set a record for having the highest Christmas opening weekend, beating Michael. For two years, the film would hold this record until 2000 when Cast Away took it. After its first weekend, it was the #2 film for four weeks. The film grossed US$202.3 million worldwide—$135 million in the United States and Canada and $67.3 million in other territories.

Critical reception
On the review aggregator Rotten Tomatoes, Patch Adams has an approval score of 21% based on 71 reviews and an average rating of 4.20/10. The critical consensus reads, "Syrupy performances and directing make this dramedy all too obvious."  On Metacritic, the film holds a score of 25 out of 100 based on reviews from 21 critics, indicating "generally unfavorable reviews".
Audiences surveyed by CinemaScore gave the film a grade "B" on scale of A to F.

Janet Maslin of The New York Times criticized the film's lowbrow comedy, which did not mesh well with its "maudlin streak" and that the sentiment felt "fabricated". Lisa Schwarzbaum of Entertainment Weekly gave the film an F, deeming it "an offensive and deeply false 'inspirational' drama", lambasting the over-simplified portrayal of the medical establishment of the time. Robert K. Elder of the Chicago Tribune called Monica Potter "the best thing about the otherwise dopey Patch Adams."

Chicago Sun-Times film critic Roger Ebert gave the film one and a half stars out of four and wrote, "Patch Adams made me want to spray the screen with Lysol. This movie is shameless. It's not merely a tearjerker. It extracts tears individually by liposuction, without anesthesia." It received "Two Thumbs Down" on his television series Siskel & Ebert, with particular criticism towards the character of Patch, who was viewed as "overbearing", "obnoxious" and "sanctimonious" as well as noting that they would never trust a doctor who acted like Adams does. Co-host Gene Siskel said "I would rather turn my head and cough than see another moment of Patch Adams again". He later singled it out as the worst film of 1998; it was the last film he gave a "Worst of" to before his death in 1999.

Awards 
Marc Shaiman's score was nominated for the Academy Award for Best Original Musical or Comedy Score. The film was also nominated for two Golden Globe Awards, for Best Motion Picture – Musical or Comedy and Best Actor – Motion Picture Musical or Comedy (Robin Williams).

Patch Adams' reaction 
The real Patch Adams has been openly critical of the film, saying that it sacrificed much of his message to make a selling film. He also said that out of all aspects of his life and activism, the film portrayed him merely as a funny doctor. At a Conference on World Affairs, he told film critic Roger Ebert, "I hate that movie."

During a speech in 2010 at the Mayo Clinic, Patch Adams said, "The film promised to build our hospital. None of the profits from the film ever came to us, and so, basically 40 years into this work, we are still trying to build our hospital." Furthermore, Adams stated,
[Robin Williams] made $21 million for four months of pretending to be me, in a very simplistic version, and did not give $10 to my free hospital. Patch Adams, the person, would have, if I had Robin's money, given all $21 million to a free hospital in a country where 80 million cannot get care.

Adams later clarified that he did not hate Williams, and Williams actively supported St. Jude Children's Research Hospital for several years. After Williams' death in 2014, Adams said "I'm enormously grateful for his wonderful performance of my early life, which has allowed the Gesundheit Institute to continue and expand our work."

Home media 
Patch Adams was released on a Collector's Edition DVD on June 22, 1999. On August 16, 2016, the film was released on Blu-ray for the first time.

Soundtrack

The soundtrack for Patch Adams was released on December 22, 1998 on CD and cassette by Universal Records.

Tracks 10 through 18 written and performed by Marc Shaiman.

See also
 List of films featuring diabetes
 Munna Bhai M.B.B.S. – a 2003 Bollywood film with a similar premise

References

External links

 
 The Real Patch Adams Official Web Site
 Patch Adams the film VS the real Patch Adams

1998 films
American comedy-drama films
American biographical drama films
Comedy-drama films based on actual events
Films directed by Tom Shadyac
Films shot in North Carolina
Films set in Virginia
Films set in West Virginia
Virginia Commonwealth University
1998 comedy-drama films
Medical-themed films
Universal Pictures films
Biographical films about physicians
Films scored by Marc Shaiman
1990s biographical films
Films with screenplays by Steve Oedekerk
1990s English-language films
1990s American films